Scott Fischer (born May 1, 1966, in Louisville, Kentucky) is an American film producer.

Biography
Fischer is President of Firstar Films, a Los Angeles–based film production company. He has been credited with producing such films as Henry's Crime (2010), Brothers (2009), Get Low (2009), A Perfect Getaway (2009), The Forbidden Kingdom (2008), The Bank Job (2008) and Battle in Seattle (2007).

Personal life
Fischer has two daughters, Alexis (Lexi) Diana and Jaclyn (Jadi) Dinah.

References

External links
28dayslateranalysis.com
Collider.com
Monstersandcritics.com
Filmofilia.com
Courier-journal.com
Ongo.com
Pro.imdb.com
Courier-journal.com

1966 births
Living people
Businesspeople from Louisville, Kentucky
Film producers from Kentucky